Pumpkinhead or Punkinhead may refer to:

Film
 Pumpkinhead (film series), a 1988 horror film and its three sequels:
 Pumpkinhead (film) (1988)
 Pumpkinhead II: Blood Wings (1994)
Pumpkinhead: Ashes to Ashes (2006)
Pumpkinhead: Blood Feud (2007)

Fictional characters
 Jack Pumpkinhead, from Oz book series by L. Frank Baum 
 Jack Pumpkinhead of Oz, 1929 book, 23rd in Oz book series by L. Frank Baum 
 Mervyn Pumpkinhead from The Sandman comics by Neil Gaiman
 Sometimes incorrectly used as the name of Malibu Comics character Lord Pumpkin

Punkinhead
 Punkinhead, a toy bear created by the Eaton's department store chain in Canada in 1947
 Punkinhead, in the comic Tiger

Music
Pumpkinhead (rapper), a hip hop music artist
Pumpkinhead (band), an alternative band from New Zealand
PunkinHed, a 2007 EP by southern rap artist Boondox
"The Ballad of Peter Pumpkinhead", a song by XTC from their album Nonsuch

Art
Zuccone ("The Pumpkin Head"), 15th century sculpture by Italian Renaissance artist Donatello